Microtragus tuberculatus is an Australian species of beetle in the family Cerambycidae, which was described by Carter in 1934.

References

Parmenini
Beetles described in 1934